Cobar, an electoral district of the Legislative Assembly in the Australian state of New South Wales had two incarnations, from 1894 until 1920 and from 1930 until 1968.


Election results

Elections in the 1960s

1965

1962

Elections in the 1950s

1959

1956

1953

1950

Elections in the 1940s

1949 by-election

1947

1944

1941

Elections in the 1930s

1938

1935

1932

1930

1920 - 1930

Elections in the 1910s

1918 by-election

1917

1913

December 1911 by-election

October 1911 by-election

1910

Elections in the 1900s

1907

1904

1901

Elections in the 1890s

1898

1895

1894

Notes

References

New South Wales state electoral results by district